The 1992 Maui Invitational Tournament was an early-season college basketball tournament that was played, for the 9th time, from December 21 to 23, 1992. The tournament, which began in 1984, was part of the 1992-93 NCAA Division I men's basketball season.  The tournament was played at the Lahaina Civic Center in Maui, Hawaiiand was won by the Duke Blue Devils. It was the first title for the program and its head coach Mike Krzyzewski.

Bracket

References

Maui Invitational Tournament
Maui Invitational